Morgan Giles may refer to:

Morgan Giles Ltd., a boatyard in Devon
Francis Charles Morgan-Giles (1883–1964), a boat designer and builder from Devon, England
Rear-Admiral Sir Morgan Morgan-Giles (1914–2013), a Royal Navy officer